Soune Daniel Soungole (born 26 February 1995) is a footballer who plays as a midfielder. Born in the Ivory Coast, he represents the Niger national football team.

Honours
 Slovan Liberec
Czech Cup: 2014–15

References

External links

Soune Soungole at FC Slovan Liberec
Soune Soungole at FK Teplice
Soune Daniel Soungole at iDNES.cz 
NFT Profile

1995 births
Living people
People from Lagunes District
People with acquired Nigerien citizenship
Nigerien footballers
Niger international footballers
Ivorian footballers
Ivory Coast youth international footballers
Ivorian people of Nigerien descent
Association football midfielders
FC Slovan Liberec players
FC Spartak Trnava players
Slovak Super Liga players
Czech First League players
FK Teplice players
Busaiteen Club players
Nigerien expatriate footballers
Ivorian expatriate footballers
Expatriate footballers in the Czech Republic
Ivorian expatriate sportspeople in the Czech Republic
Nigerien expatriate sportspeople in the Czech Republic
Expatriate footballers in Slovakia
Ivorian expatriate sportspeople in Slovakia
Nigerien expatriate sportspeople in Slovakia
Expatriate footballers in Bahrain
Ivorian expatriate sportspeople in Bahrain
Nigerien expatriate sportspeople in Bahrain